An ology or -logy, is a scientific discipline.

Ology or Ologies may also refer to:

"OLogy", A science website for kids from American Museum of Natural History
Ology (book series), book series
Ology (album), 2016 album by Gallant
"Ology", song by Living Colour from the album Time's Up
List of words ending in ology